Annona oligocarpa is a species of plant in the Annonaceae family. It is endemic to Ecuador.  Its natural habitats are subtropical or tropical dry forests and subtropical or tropical moist lowland forests. It is threatened by habitat loss.

References

oligocarpa
Endemic flora of Ecuador
Endangered plants
Taxonomy articles created by Polbot